The 2019–20 Tennessee State Tigers basketball team represented Tennessee State University in the 2019–20 NCAA Division I men's basketball season. The Tigers, led by second-year head coach Brian Collins, played their home games at the Gentry Complex in Nashville, Tennessee as members of the Ohio Valley Conference. They finished the season 18–15, 9–9 in OVC play to finish in a tie for fifth place. They defeated Morehead State in the first round of the OVC tournament before losing in the quarterfinals to Eastern Kentucky. They accepted an invitation to participate in the 2020 CollegeInsider.com Postseason Tournament and were set to host a first-round game. However, the CIT was cancelled amid the COVID-19 pandemic.

Previous season
The Tigers finished the 2018–19 season 9–21 overall, 6–12 during OVC play, and finishing in a four-way tie for seventh place. Since only the top eight teams in the conference qualify for the OVC tournament, tiebreakers left Tennessee State as the No. 9 seed, preventing them from participating.

Roster

Schedule and results

|-
!colspan=12 style=| Non-conference regular season

|-
!colspan=9 style=| Ohio Valley regular season

|-
!colspan=12 style=| Ohio Valley Conference tournament
|-

|-
!colspan=12 style=| CIT
|-
|- style="background:#bbbbbb"
| style="text-align:center"|March 17, 20207:00 pm, ESPN+
| style="text-align:center"| 
| First roundCoach John McLendon Classic
| colspan=2 rowspan=1 style="text-align:center"|Cancelled due to the COVID-19 pandemic
| style="text-align:center"|Gentry ComplexNashville, TN
|-

Source

References

Tennessee State Tigers basketball seasons
Tennessee State Tigers
Tennessee State Tigers basketball
Tennessee State Tigers basketball